Weekend Man is the third studio album by Swedish rock band, Royal Republic. The album was released on 26 February 2016 through Capitol Records.

Track listing

Personnel 
The following individuals were credited for the production of this album.
Royal Republic
 Jonas Almén
 Per Andreasson
 Adam Grahn
 Hannes Irengård
Production
 Michael Ibert – Mixing
 Christian Neander – Producing
 Michael Tibes – Producing
 Michael Tibes – Recording 
 Tom Coyne – Mastering
 Michael Ilbert – Mixing
 Udo Masshoff – Drum Technician 
Creative
 Rocket & Wink – Artwork
 Erik Weiss – Photography

Charts

References

External links 
 

2016 albums
Royal Republic albums
Capitol Records albums